The Chilean Football Derby (El clásico del fútbol chileno) is the most important rivalry in Chilean football. It is contested between Colo-Colo and Universidad de Chile. It is the most fiercest derby in the country.

Colo-Colo is the most popular football club in Chile and though its supporters can be found in volumes through all socioeconomic strata, it has been traditionally linked to the working class. Sporting achievements since its foundation in 1925 and specially the death of its captain and founder David Arellano in 1927 gave Colo-Colo a huge fan base.

However, since the 60's, its once unrivaled supremacy has been put to test with the up-rise of Universidad de Chile and its long-remembered Ballet Azul team. Representing varsity values and the middle class, Universidad de Chile has seen an increase in its popularity, with who take pride in their fidelity, having endured long droughts without trophies and even relegation from the top tier.

Statistics
As of 21 October 2022

See also

 Football Rivalries in Chile

External links
 Colo Colo
 Universidad de Chile
 Football Derbies
 The Classic from FIFA.com

Rivalries
Club Universidad de Chile
Colo-Colo